The Violet Archers is a Canadian indie pop band from Toronto. Led by former Rheostatics bassist Tim Vesely, the band consists of Vesely on vocals, Yawd Sylvester on guitar, drummer Camille Giroux, bassist Scott Remila, Ida Nilsen on piano.

History
The Violet Archers were founded by Vesely as a side project while he was performing with the Rheostatics; he gave the band its name after hearing one of Canadian composer Violet Archer's compositions played on CBC Radio.

The Violet Archers released their debut album, The End of Part One, in 2005 on Northern Electric Records. and as a digital download through Zunior Records. Musicians contributing to the album included Aaron MacPherson and Steve Pitkin. By Divine Right's José Miguel Contreras also appears as a guest musician on several tracks. The band's second album, Sunshine at Night, was released in 2008 following Vesely's departure from Rheostatics.
 
Nilsen also has her own band, Great Aunt Ida, in which Vesely also plays.

Discography
 The End of Part One (2005)
 Sunshine at Night (2008)

Compilation inclusions
 Our Power (2006): "You and I"

References

External links
The Violet Archers, official site
"The Violet Archers" at allmusic.com

Musical groups established in 2005
Musical groups from Toronto
Canadian indie pop groups
2005 establishments in Ontario